Adam Crooks,  (December 11, 1827 – December 28, 1885) was an Ontario Member of the Legislative Assembly of Ontario for Toronto West from 1871 to 1874 and moved to the riding of Oxford South from 1875 to 1886.

Background
Crooks was born in West Flamboro, Ontario and the son of James Crooks & Jane Cummings. He studied at Upper Canada College and the University of Toronto. During his time in Toronto, he studied law and was called to the bar in 1851. Crooks married Emily Ann C. Evans in 1857. Their child, Lawrence Ogden Crooks, was born in 1858. During the early 1860s, Adam Crooks successfully appealed a lower court decision against the Commercial Bank of Canada before the Judicial Committee of the Privy Council in England. In 1863, he was named Queen's Counsel. Near the end of his life, he suffered from problems with his physical and mental health and was forced to retire from public life. He died in Hartford, Connecticut.

Politics
He served as Attorney General from 1871 to 1872 and provincial treasurer from 1872 to 1877. Crooks played a major role in developing the 1876 liquor licence act, also known as the Crooks Act, which attempted to control the sale of alcohol within the province. He also served as the first Minister of Education in Ontario, appointed in 1876, after the retirement of Rev. Dr. Egerton Ryerson, who was Chief Superintendent.

References

External links 
 
 

1827 births
1885 deaths
Attorneys General of Ontario
Canadian King's Counsel
Finance ministers of Ontario
Ontario Liberal Party MPPs
Politicians from Hamilton, Ontario
University of Toronto alumni
Upper Canada College alumni